Mentzen is a surname. Notable people with the name include:

 , German painter
 Frédéric Mentzen, composer; see Alone in the Dark 3
 ), Polish politician and leader of the Confederation Liberty and Independence
 Raphael Mentzen, trumpet player, see Release the Stars

See also 
 Mentz
 Mentzer